The Cup of Ukrainian PFL was a team football competition by the Olympic (knockout)-system of elimination. The first and second editions of the competition were introduced in 2009 and were in some ways similar in nature to the competition of the neighbor-country, the Russian Federation. 

The president of the PFL, Sviatoslav Syrota, stated that the tournament was meant to become a traditional competition with a possibility of increasing the frequency of its occurrence as well as increasing the list of its participants. The club competition was officially presented and confirmed by the declarations of the Central Council of PFL #18 of July 17, 2009 and the Executive Committee of FFU #19 of July 24, 2009. All the administrative and organizational issues of the competition organization were secured by the PFL of Ukraine. The conditions of that competition was regulated by the statute, a copy of which can be found on the official web-site of PFL.

Initial edition
The first edition of the competition consisted of two rounds with four teams participating in it. Each team represented each Division of the PFL together with a students' team. One of the interesting requirements of the first couple of editions of the tournament was that the players that participated in the competition could be older than 23 years. There were teams of the Ukrainian First League, the Ukrainian Second League Group A and B, and the Ukrainian Student Football League. In June 2009 there was another tournament of the same kind, with the First League members winning.

The first edition of the competition started from semi-finals, with the winners advancing to the final, and the losing teams to the match for third place. The second edition took place the same year, but later in summer at season's break. At the start of 2009-2010 football season there was a proposition to turn the competition into a club level competition for the members of the Second League. The proposition offered to split all participants into eight groups (some three, some four) and after home and away matches were played the first two teams would advance into the best of 16 round. There and in the quarterfinals the teams would play a single game with the home team drawn. In the semifinals teams would play by home and away principle and then enter the final game which would decide who is the winner.

Reorganization (the 2010 League Cup)
By the end of the summer it was officially announced that the club tournament definitely would take place in the fall of 2009. The first edition of such competition was set to have participants out of the Second League as well as various amateur clubs. The first matches were scheduled on September 9. The participants were split in eight groups of three with the best two progressing into the next round of 16.

For the participation in the competition were allowed all the professional clubs that were active members of the PFL, the amateur clubs that were vouched for by their respective regional football federations, and some of the second squads of the First League clubs. The first official club competition consisted of five stages. The first stage was the group stage where participants were split in eight groups of three teams by regional principle. At that stage every team played two games with its of its opponents, home and away. All games were played in the fall. The winners of the groups were the home teams in the next round. 

Two best teams advanced into the next stage where the participants resumed the competition in the spring. That stage and the next consisted of a single match. The winners of the semifinals were to be decided in two games which would advance into a single final game, taken place by the end of May. The draws for the next stage would be held upon the conclusion of the previous.

At the start of 2010 suddenly the competition was on the brink of extinction with several clubs pulling their teams out of it. The competition's funds also were almost depleted. Luckily the new president of the League was able to find a new sponsor in face of Umbro and renaming the Cup's title as the Umbro League Cup. It was decided to continue with competition with the available participants.

Conclusion
The next season 2010-2011 of the tournament was rather indefinite and by the end of the August (August 26) 2010 was announced to be suspended for at least a month until the next meeting of the Central Council of PFL. Finally, the competition was never resumed and discontinued.

Champions and top goalscorers
Cup of Ukrainian PFL

Ukrainian League Cup

See also 
 PFL

References

External links 
 Professional football league of Ukraine - official site
 Football Federation of Ukraine - official site
 Ukrainian Soccer Fan Club (ukrainiansoccer.net) - amateur's site
 The statute of the competition - official site

  
PFL Cup
PFL
Recurring sporting events established in 2009
2009 establishments in Ukraine
Recurring sporting events disestablished in 2010
2010 disestablishments in Ukraine